Church Broughton is a village and civil parish in Derbyshire,  to the west of Derby. It has a church (Saint Michael and All Angels) and a Methodist chapel (1828). Badway Green is a piece of common land within the parish. It is an isolated village surrounded by farmland.

History
In the early 1870s, Church Broughton was described as:

A parish in the district of Burton-upon-Trent and county of Derby; 2½ miles NNE of Scropton r. station. It includes the hamlets of Sapperton and Harehill; and has a post office, of the name of Church-Broughton, under Derby. The church is ancient, and was recently repaired. There are a Primitive Methodist chapel, an endowed school with £30 a year, and charities £22.

Church Broughton used to be part of the ancient Appletree Hundred, or Wapentake. The nearest place to Church Broughton that is mentioned in the Domesday Book is Barton, only  from the village and with a total population of "31 households (quite large)", "4 ploughlands (land for), 3 lord's plough teams, 7 men's plough teams" and "64 meadow acres, 2 mills and 1 church." The associated lords of different estates in this area in 1066 were Edric of Tissington, Alfheah of Barton, Dunning, Leodmer of Barton and Leofnoth Sterre.

There are two cottages next to the church that date from 1711. The local primary school used to be a barn; it was given by the Duke of Devonshire for school use in 1745. At the time, there were 60 houses in the village. The shop and the far end of Royal Oak Cottage were built around the early 1760s.

Enclosure movement in Church Broughton
Enclosure occurred in Church Broughton in the 18th and 19th centuries; land that had been formerly owned in common by all members of a village became privately owned. This entailed erecting walls, fences and hedges around new enclosed areas. The English government and aristocracy claimed this would allow for better raising of animals and crops, and that large fields could be farmed more productively than individual plots of the common land.

Negotiations started in 1758 for Church Broughton to be enclosed in 1775. Farmers within the village bought and sold land from each other. The people who held little or no land but had been allowed to graze their animals on the common land were bought out by wealthier land owners, and then employed for labour.

388 acres were enclosed in 1775; the vicar, supplemented by Queen Anne's Bounty, held  and the church had .

The former RAF Church Broughton is nearby.

Population change
The population of Church Broughton has fluctuated over 264 years, with large increases in population in the 1850s and sudden decreases in the early 1950s. Population has since increased to the present day.

Present day
Broughton Heath has a population of 615 residents according to the 2011 census data.

It was first established in 1998 and is one of the longest 18-hole par 3 golf courses in the country.

Transport
There is one local bus that runs from Boylestone, Church Broughton, and Scropton to John Port Spencer Academy in Etwall only in term times. Pupils from Church Broughton Primary School typically move on to John Port School.

See also
Listed buildings in Church Broughton

References

External links

Civil parishes in Derbyshire
Villages in Derbyshire
Enclosures
South Derbyshire District